Allium dictyoprasum is a Southwest Asian species of onion in the amaryllis family, found in Israel, Palestine, Lebanon, Turkey, Caucasus, Iran, Iraq, Turkmenistan and Saudi Arabia. It is a bulb-forming perennial producing a tight umbel of white, yellow or green flowers.

References

dictyoprasum
Onions
Flora of temperate Asia
Plants described in 1843
Flora of Lebanon